The R516 road is a regional road in Ireland which links Croom in County Limerick with Emly in County Tipperary. The road passes through the villages of Bruff and Hospital.

See also 

 Roads in Ireland
 National primary road
 National secondary road

References 

Regional roads in the Republic of Ireland

Roads in County Limerick
Roads in County Tipperary